Michal Hieronim Leszczyc-Suminski (born 30 September 1820 in Ośno - died 26 May 1898 in Tharandt) was a Polish botanist, painter and art collector. He was an alumnus of Humboldt University of Berlin.

Biography

He married Anne Hudson (1830–1874), the daughter of George Hudson, the so-called Railway King of England.

Scientific achievements
Zur Entwickelungs-Geschichte der Farrnkräuter (German) (English, The Evolution of Ferns (1848).

Art

References

External links

 

1820 births
1898 deaths
Polish art collectors
Humboldt University of Berlin alumni
19th-century Polish botanists
19th-century Polish painters
19th-century Polish male artists
People from Aleksandrów County
Polish male painters